Events in the year 2005 in Brazil.

Incumbents

Federal government
 President: Luiz Inácio Lula da Silva 
 Vice President: José Alencar Gomes da Silva

Governors
 Acre: Jorge Viana 
 Alagoas: Ronaldo Lessa 
 Amapa: Waldez Góes
 Amazonas: Eduardo Braga
 Bahia: Paulo Souto
 Ceará: Lúcio Alcântara
 Espírito Santo: Paulo Hartung
 Goiás: Marconi Perillo 
 Maranhão: José Reinaldo Tavares
 Mato Grosso: Blairo Maggi
 Mato Grosso do Sul: José Orcírio Miranda dos Santos
 Minas Gerais: Aécio Neves
 Pará: Simão Jatene
 Paraíba: Cássio Cunha Lima
 Paraná: Hermas Eurides Brandão
 Pernambuco: Jarbas Vasconcelos 
 Piauí: Wellington Dias
 Rio de Janeiro: Rosinha Garotinho
 Rio Grande do Norte: Wilma Maria de Faria
 Rio Grande do Sul: Germano Rigotto
 Rondônia: Ivo Narciso Cassol
 Roraima: Ottomar de Sousa Pinto
 Santa Catarina: Luiz Henrique da Silveira 
 São Paulo: Geraldo Alckmin 
 Sergipe: João Filho
 Tocantins: Marcelo Miranda

Vice governors
 Acre: Arnóbio Marques de Almeida Júnior 
 Alagoas: Luís Abílio de Sousa Neto 
 Amapá: Pedro Paulo Dias de Carvalho 
 Amazonas: Omar José Abdel Aziz 
 Bahia: Eraldo Tinoco Melo 
 Ceará: Francisco de Queiroz Maia Júnior 
 Espírito Santo: Wellington Coimbra 
 Goiás: Alcides Rodrigues Filho 
 Maranhão: Jurandir Ferro do Lago Filho 
 Mato Grosso: Iraci Araújo Moreira 
 Mato Grosso do Sul: Egon Krakheche 
 Minas Gerais: Clésio Soares de Andrade 
 Pará: Valéria Pires Franco 
 Paraíba: Lauremília Lucena 
 Paraná: Orlando Pessuti 
 Pernambuco: José Mendonça Bezerra Filho 
 Piauí: Osmar Ribeiro de Almeida Júnior 
 Rio de Janeiro:
 Rio Grande do Norte: Antônio Jácome 
 Rio Grande do Sul: Antônio Carlos Hohlfeldt 
 Rondônia: Odaísa Fernandes Ferreira 
 Roraima: Erci de Moraes 
 Santa Catarina: Eduardo Pinho Moreira 
 São Paulo: Claudio Lembo 
 Sergipe: Marília Mandarino 
 Tocantins: Raimundo Nonato Pires dos Santos

Events

 January 27 – An airlines operation, VASP was ceases of all regular flights, this airline completely bankrupt on September 4, 2008. 
 August 6 – Banco Central burglary at Fortaleza
 September 23 – Brazilian football match-fixing scandal
 September 29 – 2005 MTV Video Music Brazil 
 October 23 – Brazilian firearms and ammunition referendum, 2005

Film

 List of Brazilian films of 2005

Television

Debuted
 Alma Gêmea
 Anabel
 Belíssima
 Dança dos Famosos
 Fudêncio e Seus Amigos
 Mandrake
 Pixcodelics

Ended
 City of Men
 Começar de Novo
 A Escrava Isaura
 Esmeralda
 Floribella
 Senhora do Destino

Music
 Black Drawing Chalks and Ksis are formed. 
 Smack (Brazilian band) reunite. 
 MX (band) reunite for a second time. 
 Patife Band reunite also for a second time.

Sport
 2005 in Brazilian football
 2005 Grand Prix de Futsal
 2005 FIFA Beach Soccer World Cup
 2005 Brazilian Grand Prix
 2005 Desafio Internacional das Estrelas
 2005 Stock Car Brasil season
 2005 Brasil Open 
 2005 Volleyball America's Cup in São Leopoldo, Rio Grande do Sul. 
 2005 Men's South American Volleyball Championship in Lages, Santa Catarina (state).
 2005 Pan American Men's Youth Handball Championship in Brusque, Santa Catarina.
 Brazil become 2nd in the 2005 South American Rugby Championship "B" in Paraguay. 
 2005 Saint Silvester Road Race
 Jungle Fight 4 MMA event. 
 2005 Copa América de Ciclismo

See also 
2005 in Brazilian football

 
2000s in Brazil
Years of the 21st century in Brazil
Brazil
Brazil